Harvard brick is a technique for building brick facades in imitation of much older ones. It was originated by architect Charles McKim in conjunction with the construction (1889) of the Johnston Gate, the "oldest and grandest" of the gates surrounding Harvard Yard in Cambridge, Massachusetts. "McKim made the gate harmonious with the Yard's older buildings... To convey a sense of age, he looked for 'culls', bricks that had been turned green, tan, or black by excessive heat. He laid them out in a sophisticated pattern called Flemish bond",
thus achieving "just the variegated color and texture of the weathered walls of neighboring Massachusetts and Harvard Halls."

References

Bricks